Serotonylation is a receptor independent signaling mechanism by which serotonin activates intracellular processes by creating long lasting covalent bonds upon proteins. It occurs through the modification of proteins by the attachment of serotonin  on their glutamine residues. This happens through the enzyme transglutaminase and the creation of glutamyl-amide bonds.  This  process occurs following serotonin transportation  into the cell rather on plasma membranes as with the brief interactions that serotonin has when it activates 5-HT receptors.

Functions

Serotonylation is the process by which serotonin effects the exocytosis of alpha-granules from platelets (also known as thrombocytes). This involves the serotonylation of small GTPases such as Rab4 and RhoA. It has been suggested that "further understanding of the specific hormonal role of 5-HT in hemostasis and thrombosis is important to possibly prevent and treat deleterious hemorrhagic and cardiovascular disorders." Serotonylation has recently identified as playing a critical role in pulmonary hypertension.

Serotonylation also through small GTPases is involved in the process by which serotonin controls  the release of insulin from beta cells in the pancreas and so the regulation of blood glucose levels. This role helps explain why defects in transglutaminase can lead to glucose intolerance. Though small GTPases are involved, the existence of a large amount of protein-bound serotonin suggests the presence of yet unidentified other serotonylation interactions. 

Serotonylation of proteins other than small GTPases underlies the regulation of vascular smooth muscle "tone" in blood vessels including the aorta. This may occur through serotonylation modifying proteins integral to the contractility and the cytoskeleton such as alpha-actin, beta-actin, gamma-actin, myosin heavy chain and filamin A

History
According to some serotonin was "named for its source (sero-) and ability to modify smooth muscle tone (tonin)" an effect that may be dependent (some controversy exists) upon  serotonylation. 

The term serotonylation was created in 2003 by Diego J. Walther and colleagues of the Max Planck Institute for Molecular Genetics in a paper in the journal Cell.

References

Cell signaling
Serotonin
Signal transduction